John Alan Martin (23 November 1923 – 2004) was an English footballer who played as a half-back and inside-forward. A pacey and intelligent player, he scored 94 goals in 292 league appearances in eleven years in the Football League.

He began his career at Port Vale, turning professional in December 1942. He was sold to Stoke City in exchange for Albert Mullard and £10,000 in September 1951, and played First Division football for the "Potters". He spent 1955 to 1957 at Bangor City, before re-joining Port Vale in July 1957. He helped the "Valiants" to win the Fourth Division title in 1958–59, before moving on to Northwich Victoria.

Career
Martin joined Port Vale in February 1941 as an amateur, signing professional forms in December 1942. He played 14 Third Division South games in 1946–47. He scored his first senior goals at The Old Recreation Ground in a 4–1 win over Ipswich Town on 1 November 1947, and was an ever-present throughout the 1947–48 campaign, scoring eight goals. He again played every minute of the 1948–49 season, and also bagged seven goals. He scored eight goals in 28 games in 1949–50, and five goals in 46 games in 1950–51. Manager Gordon Hodgson died in June 1951, and his replacement, Ivor Powell, sold Martin to Potteries derby rivals to Stoke City in exchange for Albert Mullard and £10,000 in September 1951. This was a club record for Stoke.

Martin scored twice in 34 First Division games in 1951–52, as the "Potters" narrowly avoided relegation under Bob McGrory. However relegation was not avoided in 1952–53 under new boss Frank Taylor, with Martin scoring four goals in 30 appearances. He made 38 Second Division appearances in 1953–54 but featured just six times in 1954–55, and left the Victoria Ground for Welsh club Bangor City.

Martin returned to Burslem to re-sign for Port Vale on non-contract terms in July 1957; the club were now playing at Vale Park and managed by Norman Low, though were still in the Third Division South. He featured just three times in 1957–58, but made 16 appearances in the Fourth Division title winning season of 1958–59. He then left the club to become player-manager of Northwich Victoria, and also spent time coaching the Vale juniors.

Style of play
Former teammate Roy Sproson said that: "Alan's assets were his pace and good control. He was extremely good on the ball and a highly intelligent player too."

Career statistics
Source:

Honours
Port Vale
Football League Fourth Division: 1958–59

References

Footballers from Stoke-on-Trent
English footballers
Association football midfielders
Association football forwards
Port Vale F.C. players
Stoke City F.C. players
Bangor City F.C. players
Northwich Victoria F.C. players
English Football League players
Association football player-managers
English football managers
Association football coaches
Port Vale F.C. non-playing staff
1923 births
2004 deaths
Date of death unknown
Place of death missing